Windsor Thomas White (August 28, 1866 – April 9, 1958) was an American automobile developer. A native of Orange, Massachusetts, he produced the White steamer cars in 1900, and later expanded to trucks. These vehicles were used militarily during World War I. White, along with two of his brothers Rollin White and Walter, were inducted into the Automotive Hall of Fame in 1997.

He was the father of polo player Windsor Holden White.

References

External links

1866 births
1958 deaths
American businesspeople
People in the automobile industry
People from Orange, Massachusetts